Klio was the name of two ships operated by Dampschiffahrts Gesellschaft Neptun AG (Neptun Line).

Ship names